The 1964–65 season was FC Dinamo București's 16th season in Divizia A. Dinamo won for the fourth consecutive time the championship, the longest series of trophies in their history. In the European Cup, Dinamo are eliminated in the first round by the trophy holder, Inter Milan.

Results

European Cup 
Preliminary round – first leg

Second leg

First round – first leg

Second leg

Squad 

Goalkeepers: Ilie Datcu (24 / 0); Iuliu Uțu (6 / 0).
Defenders: Cornel Popa (25 / 0); Ion Nunweiller (25 / 0); Lică Nunweiller (13 / 2); Constantin Ștefan (22 / 0); Dumitru Ivan (19 / 0).
Midfielders:  Emil Petru (19 / 4); Octavian Popescu (19 / 4); Vasile Gergely (20 / 0).
Forwards: Ion Pîrcălab (20 / 7); Radu Nunweiller (18 / 1); Constantin Frățilă (23 / 11); Gheorghe Ene (23 / 15); Ion Haidu (23 / 10); Gheorghe Grozea (4 / 0); Iosif Varga (2 / 0); Ion Țîrcovnicu (1 / 0); Vasile Ionescu (1 / 0); Mircea Lucescu (1 / 0).
(league appearances and goals listed in brackets)

Manager: Angelo Niculescu.

Transfers 

Țîrcovnicu and Varga were transferred to Dinamo Piteşti. Gheorghe Grozea made his debut in the first squad.

References 

 www.labtof.ro
 www.romaniansoccer.ro

1964
Association football clubs 1964–65 season
Dinamo
1964